Elena may refer to:

People
 Elena (given name), including a list of people and characters with this name
 Joan Ignasi Elena (born 1968), Catalan politician
 Francine Elena (born 1986), British poet

Geography
 Elena (town), a town in Veliko Tarnovo Province, Bulgaria
 Elena Municipality
 Elena (village), a village in Haskovo Province

Film and television
 Elena (2011 film), a 2011 Russian film
 Elena (2012 film), a Brazilian film
 Elena (TV series), a Mexican telenovela
 Elena of Avalor, an American TV series
 Daniele Cortis, a 1947 Italian film also known as Elena

Music
 Elena (Cavalli), a 1659 opera by Francesco Cavalli
 Elena (Mayr), an 1814 opera by Mayr
 "Elena" (song), a 1979 song by The Marc Tanner Band
 Elena, an EP by Puerto Muerto

Other
 Elena (play), a Cebuano play by Vicente Sotto
 Extra Low ENergy Antiproton ring, a storage ring in the Antiproton Decelerator facility at CERN
 Hurricane Elena

See also 
 Eleni (disambiguation)
 Ellena, a surname
 Helena (disambiguation)